En spännande dag för Josefine is a 1982 Curt Haagers studio album. It peaked at number 36 in the Swedish albums chart.

Track listing
En spännande dag för Josefine
Aldrig nå'nsin glömmer jag dej
En gammal man och ett hav (Der alte Mann und das Meer)
Gloryland
Öppna landskap (based on: Hör hur västanvinden susar)
Var ska vi sova i natt baby (Sara perche ti amo)
Det är sången om dej (La Paloma)
Göta kanal (Einmal verliebt immer verliebt)
Boeves psalm
Att dansa med dej
Låt kärleken slå rot
Ta de' lugnt (By the Light of the Silvery Moon)
Godnatt Irene (Goodnight Irene)

Chart positions

References 

1982 albums
Curt Haagers albums